Crandell Addington (born June 2, 1938, in Graham, Texas) is an entrepreneur and poker player who is best known as one of the founders of the World Series of Poker, and is a member of the Poker Hall of Fame.

Poker 
Known as "Dandy" because he was always well-dressed, Addington was a regular player in the Texas poker circuit in the 1960s.  In 1969, he won the Texas Gamblers Convention in Reno, Nevada; it was there that the idea for the World Series of Poker was conceived. At the time, Addington was already a self-made millionaire who played poker primarily for fun; for him, the game was more about personal challenge.

Addington participated in the first World Series of Poker in 1970 along with Amarillo Slim, Doyle Brunson, Sailor Roberts, Puggy Pearson, and Carl Cannon. Addington made the final table of the WSOP Main Event almost every year from 1972 to 1979, and still holds the record for most final table appearances (seven). He finished second on two occasions, losing to Johnny Moss in 1974 and Bobby Baldwin in 1978.  However, since the WSOP Main Event was winner-take-all until 1978, most of these appearances were not in the money finishes.  

Although he is no longer an active player and has not had a tournament cash since 1990, fellow Hall of Famer Doyle Brunson has described him as a "No Limit Hold'em Legend".

In 2005, Addington took another shot at a WSOP win when he returned to Vegas to be inducted into the Poker Hall of Fame, but did not fare as well as he had in the 1970s.

As of 2008, his total live tournament winnings exceed $160,000.

Business 
Addington graduated from Southwestern University with majors in economics and accounting. He left his professional poker career in the 1980s to put his business degree to work. Over the course of his 40 years as an entrepreneur, he founded successful businesses ranging from chemical manufacturing to oil and gas exploration.  

He is the currently the CEO, Chairman, and Director of Phoenix Biotechnology, a company that focuses on cancer treatment research.

Notes

External links 

Phoenix Biotechnology

1938 births
American poker players
American casino industry businesspeople
Businesspeople from San Antonio
People from Graham, Texas
Living people
Poker Hall of Fame inductees